The Chinnor and Princes Risborough Railway is a preserved standard gauge heritage railway with its headquarters and main station at Chinnor in South Oxfordshire, England. It runs along the foot of the Chilterns escarpment. Although a few fields away it has since been given the nickname 'The Icknield Line' for its connection to the Lower Icknield Way.

History 
The line was part of the former Great Western Railway branch line between Watlington and Princes Risborough. British Railways closed the line to passenger traffic in 1957. The section between Chinnor and Princes Risborough thereafter carried a freight-only cement service until 1989.

Preservation

Reopening
The Chinnor and Princes Risborough Railway Association was formed around August 1989. On 19 May 1991, the first train - a works train headed by a 0-4-0 Baguley diesel - ran from Chinnor. It began to operate passenger trains between Chinnor and the site of the former Wainhill Halt (about 1 km NE of Chinnor) in August 1994. In 1995, the route was extended by about 3 km to Horsenden Lane, and then to the old rail connection that led trains to Oxford now known as Thame Junction in 1996.  On 21 February 2016, the railway was connected to the main line at Princes Risborough, with services commencing later that year running in to a siding adjacent to Platform 4 at Princes Risborough while works were being undertaken to rebuild the platform there. Some service trains were not always able to run that far either due to Network Rail / Chiltern Railways requirements or other works related to platform reinstatement and continued to terminate at Thame Junction.

The railway now operates between Chinnor and platform 4 at Princes Risborough, although some services may continue to terminate and turn around at Thame Junction for operational reasons. There is no platform at Thame Junction. Work to reinstate platform 4 at Princes Risborough was completed in August 2018.

Princes Risborough extension
Following discussions with Network Rail, an extension of about a mile (1.5 km) to Princes Risborough main line railway station was undertaken, with a view to running into Princes Risborough station. This would allow passengers to connect from Chiltern Railways services on the Chiltern Main Line. Previously, the line was reconnected at a point just yards from the headshunt at Thame Junction for special events to allow trains to run into Princes Risborough station: in October 2013, the line was reconnected for the first 3 weekends for the Railway's "Haversham & Friends" celebrations, and the first through-train for 57 years, a rail tour from Aylesbury via Princes Risborough, ran on 5 October 2013.

On 21 February 2016, a small team of volunteers used a road-rail vehicle to install a track panel in place of a Network Rail buffer stop to reinstate the physical connection to Princes Risborough; the following day, official boundary gates and safety signage were installed, making the line operational. The link was used for the first time by a visiting locomotive as part of the diesel gala held on 4/5 June 2016; DB Cargo Class 66 66185 hauled 3-CEP 411198 on the 0950 from Chinnor. A test run with a single-car DMU was operated on 25 June with the train running into Princes Risborough's temporary platform 4, followed a week later by a Class 17 working and then a steam-run on 10 July. The first full public service carrying VIP guests to Risborough ran on 23 July, hauled by D3018 Haversham with the return journey worked by GWR 0-6-0PT 5786 (L.92).

Bay platform 4 of the original Watlington branch has been reconstructed at Princes Risborough by the preserved railway using, where possible materials recovered from the site; with that work completed, Chinnor & Princes Risborough Railway passengers are now able to join or leave trains at Princes Risborough on certain services.  The Chinnor and Princes Risborough Railway held an official opening ceremony of the Platform on 15 August 2018.

Future projects

A purpose built Maintenance and Education centre at a site some 200 yards south of Chinnor station has been opened.

On-screen appearances
Chinnor station has been used for the filming of various TV series including Miss Marple and Midsomer Murders.

Motive power

Steam locomotives 
GWR Large Prairie Class No. 4144, Visiting for 2023 from Didcot Railway Centre

Diesel locomotives 
BR  Class 08 No. D3018 'Haversham'. BR green. Under Repair.
BR  Class 08 No. 08825. Early Network SouthEast livery. Operational. 
BR Bo-Bo Class 17 No. D8568. Operational. Returned to Chinnor in 2022.
BR Co-Co Class 37 No. D6927 (37227). Operational.
BR A1A-A1A Class 31 97205 (31163). Off-site for major repair.
Ruston & Hornsby  459515 'IRIS'. Operational.
BR 0-6-0 Class 03 No.D2069. Operational.

Diesel multiple units 
BR Class 121 'bubble car' No. W55023. In BR Green with yellow warning panel. Under restoration.
BR Class 121 'bubble car' No. W55024. Returned from overhaul in 2019 in BR Maroon livery with yellow warning panel. Operational.

Electric multiple units 
 BR Class 411 '3CEP' No. 1198. 'Linda the Lymington Flyer' BR Blue. Built in 1960. Under restoration.

References

External links 

 The Railway website

Heritage railways in Oxfordshire
Heritage railways in Buckinghamshire
South Oxfordshire District
1989 establishments in England